Japan Society North West (JSNW) is a non-profit organization based in the northwest of England.  Its objective is the promotion of Japanese Culture.

History

JSNW grew out of the UK Japan Society of the North West, which was founded in 1996 to provide a focus for local companies with business interests in Japan.  This organisation was eventually dissolved, and many of its members then got together to form Japan Society North West in May 2004.

Japan Society North West organised a Japan Day in 2006, at Manchester Town Hall.  This event was opened by His Excellency Mr Yoshiji Nogami, Japan's Ambassador to the UK, and Councillor David Sandiford, Lord Mayor of Manchester.

See also
Japan Society of London
Anglo-Japanese relations

External links
Japan Society North West
Embassy of Japan in the UK

Japan–United Kingdom relations